Assiniboia is a town in the Canadian province of Saskatchewan.

History
The Dominion Land Survey's description of the area around Assiniboia is Sec.18, Twp.8, R.29, W2. It was first settled by people of English, French, Romanian, Scottish, and Scandinavian descent. From 30 March 1908 to 23 November 1912, the post office at this location was named Leeville, Saskatchewan.

The settlement of Assiniboia originated on 12 October 1912, when the Canadian Pacific Railway put 980 lots up for sale at the townsite as it built a branch line through southern Saskatchewan. The community grew rapidly and on 22 December 1912, it was incorporated as a village. In 1913, the population rose from 400 to 1400, and the community was incorporated as a town. The town's name comes from the former district of Assiniboia, in which the town is located.

During the Great Depression, town officials employed out-of-work men to construct the Assiniboia sewer system. Unfortunately, the town could not afford to operate it until 1948.

It was used for elementary flight school training during the World War II years of 1942-1944.

Assiniboia Regional Park 
Assiniboia Regional Park is a regional park that was founded in 1977 and is operated from three locations around the town. There's a 9-hole golf course south of town, Willows Dam east of town, and Centennial Park in town.

The Centennial Park location has a campground with 17 campsites and modern showers and washrooms. Some of the other amenities at the park include an outdoor pool, picnic area, playground, potable water, tennis courts, sani-dump, and ball diamonds.

The reservoir has a boat launch for fishing and commonly caught fish include walleye and perch. No motorised boats are allowed on the lake.

There is also a licensed club house with food and a pro shop.

Demographics 

Climate
Assiniboia has a humid continental climate (Dfb).

Education
 Seventh Avenue School (kindergarten - grade 4)
 Assiniboia Elementary School (grades 5 - 8)
 Assiniboia Composite High School (grades 9 - 12)
 Southeast Regional College - Assiniboia Campus (post-secondary)

See also
List of towns in Saskatchewan
List of communities in Saskatchewan

References

External links

Towns in Saskatchewan
Division No. 3, Saskatchewan
Lake of the Rivers No. 72, Saskatchewan